Lippett is a surname. Notable people with the surname include:

 Ronnie Lippett (born 1960), American football player
 Tony Lippett (born 1992), American football player

See also
 Lippitt (surname)